Muhammad Bahjat Athari was an Iraqi linguist, historian and investigator, student of Mahmoud Shukri Al-Alusi.

Biography 
Muhammad Bahjat Athari bin Mahmoud Effendi bin Abdul Qadir bin Ahmed bin Mahmoud al-Bakri, upbringing and birth from Baghdad, his family is well-known in trade and has many properties in Iraq.

His great-grandfather moved from Diyarbakir to Erbil. His great-grandfather Ahmed married from a Baghdadi family from the Qais clan. Zainab, the mother of Muhammad Bahjat Athari, was an Iraqi Turkmen, originally from Kirkuk, and learned Turkish, in addition to his mother tongue, Arabic.

Muhammad Bahjat was learning the book Maraki Al-Falah from his sheikh Aladdin Al-Alusi, but he did not like the book and asked his professor not to study it. So his professor Ali Al-Alusi said to him, "What do you want to read?" Muhammad Bahjat said, "I want to get to know the true Islamic jurisprudence." So the professor told him, "Then, you are the archaeologist." Muhammad Bahjat asked him about the meaning of "archaeological," so his teacher said to him, "The archaeologist is the one who follows the impact of the prophet, may blessings and peace be upon him, in word and deed."

Muhammad Bahjat  Athari died in 1416 AH / 1996 CE in Baghdad.

Education 
One of the finest Iraqi scholars who professed their sciences and literature, he took the licenses of science, literature and calligraphy from sheikh Mahmoud Shukri Al-Alusi, who died in 1923 AD, and sheikh judge Ali Ala Al-Din Al-Alusi, who died in 1921 AD. He studied at the hands of Baghdad scholars at his time. Among the scholars influenced by the scholar Numan Al-Alusi, who died in 1899 AD.

He excelled in the art of calligraphy, and his handwriting was similar to his teacher Mahmoud Shukri Al-Alousi in drawing and tuning. He has written many books for himself and his professor. His writings include the Book of Flags of Iraq. It contains the biographies of the people of Iraq, and it is rare of its kind in casting and forging.
He improved poetry systems and has two huge collections that include noble poems, and he collected a large library that is today one of the largest libraries in Baghdad that contains many scientific and literary manuscripts that have not yet been printed.

Works
His scholarly life was full of many works, as he studied Arabic and excelled in it, as well as in the field of literature and history. He used the methodology of his sheikh, the professor Mahmoud Shukri Al-Alousi, and he wrote many books up to twenty-five books, including:

 Flags of Iraq
 Outline in the history of Arabic literature
 Muwaffaq in Arab history
 Muhdhab the history of Baghdad mosques and their monuments
 The tragedy of the poet Waddah Al-Yaman
 Recent trends in Islam
 Mahmoud Shukri Al-Alousi: His Life and Linguistic Views
 Cosmic phenomena in the Qur’an
 Muhammad ibn Abd al-Wahhab, a proponent of monotheism and renewal in the modern era

Athari was among the contributors of Lughat Al Arab magazine in the mid-1920a.

Positions 
 Director of the Baghdad General Waqf Directorate.
 Head of the scientific complex in Iraq.
 Member of the Arabic Language Academy in Damascus, Jordan, and Cairo.

Honors 
 King Faisal Prize for Arabic Literature in 1406 AH / 1986 AD
 Saddam Hussein International Prize.

References 

Iraqi writers
Iraqi scholars
21st-century Iraqi writers
21st-century Arabic writers
Linguists from Iraq
1904 births
1996 deaths